The Whiskey Bandit is a 2017 Hungarian action film about Attila Ambrus, a famous Hungarian bank robber.

Cast 
 Bence Szalay - Attila Ambrus
  - young Attila Ambrus
  - Det. Bartos
  - Kata
  - Géza Bota
  - Bota
 Judit Pogány - Aunt Annuska, Attila's grandmother
 Sándor Zsótér - Kata's father
 Ildikó Tóth - Kata's mother
 Attila Ambrus - taxi driver

Release
The film premiered at the Warsaw International Film Festival on 16 October 2017 and was released in Hungary on 22 November 2017.

References

External links 

2017 action films
2017 crime films
2010s biographical films
Hungarian biographical films
Hungarian crime films
Films about bank robbery
Films set in Budapest
Films set in Romania
Films set in prison
Ice hockey films